Bashania is a genus of East Asian bamboo in the grass family, native to China and Vietnam.

Species
 Bashania abietina T.P.Yi & L.Yang  – Sichuan 
 Bashania fansipanensis T.Q.Nguyen  – Vietnam
 Bashania fargesii (E.G.Camus) Keng f. & T.P.Yi – Gansu, Hubei, Shaanxi, Sichuan 
 Bashania qingchengshanensis Keng f. & T.P.Yi – Sichuan

formerly included
see Indocalamus Sarocalamus 
 Bashania auctiaurita – Indocalamus longiauritus 
 Bashania faberi – Sarocalamus faberi  
 Bashania fangiana – Sarocalamus faberi  
 Bashania spanostachya – Sarocalamus spanostachyus 
 Bashania victorialis – Indocalamus victorialis

References

 
Bambusoideae genera